Conus petestimpsoni is a species of sea snail, a marine gastropod mollusk in the family Conidae, the cone snails, cone shells or cones.

These snails are predatory and venomous. They are capable of "stinging" humans.

Description
The length of the shell varies between 25 mm and 51 mm.

Distribution
This marine species of cone snail occurs off the Rio de Janeiro State, Brazil

References

 Petuch E.J. & Berschauer D.P. (2016). Six new species of gastropods (Fasciolariidae, Conidae, and Conilithidae) from Brazil. The Festivus. 48(4): 257-266.page(s): 259, figs 2E-H

External links
 

petestimpsoni
Gastropods described in 2016